The Banjar or Banjarese is an Austronesian language predominantly spoken by the Banjarese—an indigenous ethnic group native to Banjar regions— in the southeastern Kalimantan of Indonesia. The Banjarese language is the  lingua franca for various indigenous community especially in South Kalimantan, as well as Central Kalimantan (notably in Seruyan Regency and Sukamara Regency) and East Kalimantan in general.

Apart from the native Banjarese in Indonesia, the Banjarese language also spoken by little Banjarese diaspora abroad (such as in Brunei, Malaysia (notably in Sabah and Perak), and Singapore); however, they tend to not use it as their primary language, and their fluency degree is questionable.

Dialects
There are at least three divisions of dialects within the Banjarese language:
Batangbanyu Banjarese
Kuala Banjarese
Pahuluan Banjarese
According to Cense, the Pahuluan Banjarese are predominantly spoken by Banjarese people in the South Hulu Sungai Regency and North Hulu Sungai Regency regions.

Phonology

Consonants 
The consonantal inventory of Banjarese language is shown below. All but  occur at the onset of a syllable:

 The following consonants can close a CVC syllable: . Words cannot begin with consonant clusters. Within a root, an NC sequence will always be homorganic, though reduplication and a few prefixes such as sing- can produce other sequences, e.g. .

Vowels 
Sudarmo finds five monophthongs:

Durasid finds three monophthongs and three diphthongs in Pahuluan Banjarese:

Regionally,  has an allophone  and  has an allophone .
Loans with /e/ or /o/ are assimilated to these three vowels.

Alphabet 
The standard alphabet is as follows:

Sample text

Universal Declaration of Human Rights
The following texts are the Universal Declaration of Human Rights in Banjarese language along with the original declaration in English.

Simple conversation
Here are examples of simple conversation in Banjarese language:

Expression
Here are examples of expressions in Banjarese language:

See also 

 Banjar people
 Banjarese architecture
 Banjarmasin
 South Kalimantan
 Paradisec

References

Bibliography 

* 
* 
* 
* 
* 
* 
* 
*

External links 

Agglutinative languages
Languages of Indonesia
Languages of Malaysia
South Kalimantan
Banjar people
Malayic languages